Dane Saintus (born March 23, 1987 in Arlington, Texas) is an American soccer player.

Career

College and amateur
Saintus attended Southern Methodist University. In his freshman year, he made 15 appearances and recorded one assist. He started all 21 games his sophomore year and was named Second-team All-Conference USA selection. In his junior year, he made 17 appearances and finished tied for third in his team with three goals scored. He made 16 appearances in his senior year and finished with eight goals and five assists.

During his college years, Saintus also played for DFW Tornados in the USL Premier Development League.

Professional
On January 14, 2010, Saintus was drafted in the fourth round (54th overall) by FC Dallas in the 2010 MLS SuperDraft. However, he was cut during camp.

A year later, Saintus was signed by the Los Angeles Blues of the USL Professional Division. He made his professional debut for the Blues on June 21, 2011, in a Lamar Hunt US Open Cup game against Ventura County Fusion.

References

External links
 SMU bio

1987 births
Living people
American soccer players
DFW Tornados players
FC Dallas draft picks
OC Pateadores Blues players
Orange County SC players
SMU Mustangs men's soccer players
Soccer players from Texas
Sportspeople from Arlington, Texas
USL Championship players
USL League Two players
Association football forwards
Association football midfielders